Alexander Nairne (1862–1936) was a Canon of Windsor from 1921 to 1936 and Regius Professor of Divinity at Cambridge.

Career

He was educated at Jesus College, Cambridge, and graduated DD in 1914.

He was appointed:
Assistant curate of Great St Mary's, Cambridge 1887 - 1889
Assistant Master at Harrow School 1890 - 1892
Assistant curate at Hadleigh, Suffolk 1892 - 1894
Rector of Tewin 1894 - 1912
Professor Hebrew and Old Testament Exegesis, King’s College, London 1900 - 1917
Vicar of All Saints Church, Cambridge 1917 - 1919
Dean of Jesus College, Cambridge 1917
Canon of Chester Cathedral 1914 - 1922
Regius Professor of Divinity at Cambridge 1922 - 1932

He was appointed to the eleventh stall in St George's Chapel, Windsor Castle, in 1921, and held the stall until 1936.

References 

1875 births
1936 deaths
Academics of King's College London
Regius Professors of Divinity (University of Cambridge)
Alumni of Jesus College, Cambridge
Canons of Windsor